Robert Greenshields Meikle (ca 1830 – after 1887) was a merchant and political figure in Quebec. He represented Argenteuil in the Legislative Assembly of Quebec from 1878 to 1881 as a Liberal.

He was born in Lachute, Lower Canada, the son of John Meikle, originally a manufacturer in Glasgow, and Jean Greenshields. In 1830, he became co-owner of the general store established by his father at Lachute. Meikle was a justice of the peace and also served in the Commissioners' Court. He ran unsuccessfully for a seat in the House of Commons in 1887.

References
 

Year of death missing
Quebec Liberal Party MNAs
Year of birth uncertain
19th-century Canadian politicians